Kujtime Kurbogaj (born 26 November 1996) is an Albanian football midfielder who currently plays for FC Rosengård.

See also
List of Albania women's international footballers

References

1996 births
Living people
Albanian women's footballers
Women's association football midfielders
Albania women's international footballers
Swedish people of Kosovan descent
Swedish people of Albanian descent
Sportspeople of Albanian descent